Lake City High School is a secondary education institution located near Lake City, South Carolina. The school enrolls approximately 1,000 students.

References

External links 
 Official web site

Public high schools in South Carolina
Schools in Florence County, South Carolina
1970 establishments in South Carolina
Educational institutions established in 1970